The 2019 Great Britain Lions tour was a tour by the Great Britain national rugby league team to the Southern Hemisphere in 2019.

Background
This tour was the first matches played by the Lions since 2007 when they defeated New Zealand 3–0 during the New Zealand tour that year.  The last time the Lions travelled to Australasia was for the 2006 Tri-Nations tournament and the last full Lions tour was in 1996.

After the 2007 New Zealand tour to Great Britain the Great Britain Lions were disbanded and more emphasis was placed on the four home nations; England, Ireland, Scotland and Wales.  In 2017 the Rugby League International Federation (RLIF) announced a four-year cycle of tours and tournaments to include the resurrection of the Great Britain Lions and a tour by the team to the Southern Hemisphere. At the RLIF's 2018 meeting a proposal by the Australian Rugby League Commission for the Lions tour to be postponed in favour of a tour to Europe by the Australian Kangaroos was rejected and the 2017 announced cycle was confirmed.

Squad
The 24-man Great Britain squad was named on 14 October 2019. Ages are as of 26 October 2019.

Following injuries to Gildart and Hall, Ash Handley was called into the squad on 7 November.

Itinerary
In March 2019 it was confirmed that test matches would only be played against New Zealand, Papua New Guinea and  Tonga.

In September 2019 the Tongan National Rugby League's membership of the RLIF was suspended and in order to fulfil the fixture against the Lions a Tongan Invitational XIII was selected to play against Great Britain.  The members of the suspended Tonga board labelled the invitational side as a 'rebel' squad and insisted that the game against Great Britain could not be classed as a test match. The International Rugby League (the RLIF was rebranded earlier in October 2019) disagreed and gave the match test status.

New Zealand leg

Notes:
 Tesi Niu (Tonga), Jackson Hastings, and Josh Jones (both Great Britain) made their Test debuts. Hastings and Jones were the only Great Britain players to have not previously represented their home nation.
 James Graham (Great Britain) made his 50th Test appearance – his 6th for Great Britain, with 44 for England. He became the 4th Briton and 8th person overall to do so.
 James Graham (Great Britain) is the only player to have previously played for the Lions, who were last active in 2007.

Notes:
 Adam Blair (New Zealand) made his 50th Test appearance for New Zealand becoming the 2nd New Zealander and 9th person overall to do so.

Notes:
 Blake Austin and Jack Hughes (both Great Britain) made their Test debuts, having not previously represented their home nation.

Papua New Guinea leg

References

Great Britain Lions tour
Great Britain national rugby league team tours
Great Britain Lions tour
Great Britain Lions tour
Great Britain Lions tour
Great Britain Lions tour